The splake or slake (Salvelinus namaycush x Salvelinus fontinalis) is a hybrid of two fish species resulting from the crossing of a male brook trout (Salvelinus fontinalis) and a female lake trout (Salvelinus namaycush).  The name itself is a portmanteau of speckled trout (another name for brook trout) and lake trout, and may have been used to describe such hybrids as early as the 1880s. Hybrids of the male lake trout with the female brook trout (the so-called "brookinaw") have also been produced, but are not as successful.

The intrageneric hybrid is of the genus Salvelinus and, hence, is most properly known as a char or charr. In some locales, the fish is referred to as the wendigo.  Although the hybrid is genetically stable and is, theoretically, capable of reproducing, splake reproduction is extremely rare, for behavioural reasons, outside the hatchery environment.  The only known natural reproduction has occurred in five lakes in Algonquin Provincial Park in Ontario, Canada and, in each case, only a handful of progeny were produced.  Because splake typically do not reproduce, they are used as a sport fish in many lakes across the US.  Fishery managers are able to control populations numbers due to the extremely poor spawning success rate.

The fish possesses characteristics of both parent species.  Splake exhibit higher growth rates than either parent species and can attain 46 cm (18 in) in length only two years after being planted as fingerlings (i.e., at 2½ years of age). By way of contrast, lacustrine brook trout would approach 25 cm (10 in) in length at a similar age and similarly aged lake trout would be expected to be less than 40 cm (16 in) long.

Splake are considered "easier to catch" than other salmonids and often live longer and fare better in certain situations. Hence, splake are well suited for stocking in a variety of coldwater lakes and ponds. The maximum size is about 9 kg (20 lb), but fish over 4 kg (9 lb) are rare and are considered trophies.

An example would be in Ontario, where both F1 splake and the lake trout backcross have been planted for several years. The backcross is the result of an F1 splake male being crossed with a female lake trout (i.e., 75% lake trout and 25% brook trout).

Although splake were first described in 1880, Ontario began experimenting with the hybrids in the 1960s in an effort to replace collapsed lake trout stocks in the Great Lakes. Due to mediocre results, the experiment never really progressed beyond Georgian Bay. The theory was that splake would grow more quickly and mature sooner than lake trout with the hope that they would be able to reproduce before being attacked by the invasive sea lamprey. Unfortunately, although splake are relatively unusual among hybrids in that they are fertile, fertility in nature is behaviourally problematic—very few natural progeny are produced by introduced splake populations.

After some experimentation in the late 1970s, stocking in the Great Lakes and, especially, in Georgian Bay, was converted entirely to the so-called lake trout backcross in the early 1980s. Although the backcross program did succeed in creating some localised angling opportunities, it never achieved any degree of success in terms of natural reproduction—the backcross was only marginally better at reproducing than was the F1 splake. The F1 splake has proved to be a success, however, in providing angling opportunities in smaller lakes and most of the planting of splake in Ontario now goes to those situations. In the first of two cases, former brook trout waters which have become infested with spiny-rayed fish to the point where they no longer produce brook trout are stocked with splake. The splake grow more quickly than do wild-strain brook trout and become piscivorous at a younger age and, hence, are more tolerant of competitors than are brook trout. In the second case, relatively small lake trout lakes that experienced poor recruitment due to insufficient deep-water juvenile lake trout habitat will support fairly good splake fisheries, since splake are less dependent on extreme deep water than are the lake trout and they grow more quickly, providing a better return to anglers. In both cases, due to the behavioural sterility of splake, the fisheries are entirely dependent on artificial propagation.

References

Literature 
 Ayles, B. (1974): Relative importance of additive genetic and maternal sources of variation in early survival of young splake hybrids (Salvelinus fontinalis x S. namaycush). J. Fish. Res. Bd. Canada 31: 1499–1502.
 Berst, A. H., Ihssen, P. E., Spangler, G. R., Ayles, G. B., Martin, G. W. (1980): The splake, a hybrid charr Salvelinus namaycush x S. fontinalis. In: Balon, E. K.(ed.): Charrs, Salmonid Fishes of the Genus Salvelinus. Dr. W. Junk Publishers, The Hague, 841–887.

Salvelinus
Fish hybrids